The Mayflower was a wooden hulled scow-schooner that sank on June 2, 1891, in Lake Superior near Duluth, Minnesota, United States, after capsizing with a load of sandstone blocks. In 2012 the shipwreck site was added to the National Register of Historic Places.

History
The Mayflower (official number 92025) was built in 1887 in Sturgeon Bay, Wisconsin, by master carpenter Harry Johnson. She had a gross register tonnage of 230.4 tons, and a net register tonnage of 218.88 tons. She was a two-masted scow schooner which meant that she could sail on her own, or towed by a steam-powered vessel. Although she was a Great Lakes scow, her constructional features are more similar to the scows used in New Zealand than the scows used on the lakes.

Final voyage
On the day of June 2, 1891, the Mayflower was bound for the Duluth, Minnesota, with a cargo of sandstone which was to be used in the construction of the Central High School. She was sailing in good weather and was propelled by a wind blowing from the northwest. Her master Captain Theodore Zirbest ordered the Mayflower sails to be lowered. Soon after her sails were lowered, the Mayflower cargo shifted; this caused her to capsize. Three of her crew members were saved by the tugboat Cora A. Sheldon, but Captain Zirbest lost his grip on the lifeline that was thrown to him, and drowned.

Historical accounts are unclear about whether the Mayflower was sailing under her own power, or she was being towed by the Cora A. Sheldon.

The Mayflower today
The wreck of the Mayflower was discovered in 1991. Her hull is partially buried in sand, featuring an intact bow and stern, but her midsection is broken and almost completely covered with sand. Visibility at the site is usually poor; this is because she is close to the Lester River. Her anchors and windlass both still remain attached to her bow. Her windlass is the only known one of its type in Minnesota waters. Today only two partially intact scows are known to exist on Lake Superior: the Mayflower in Minnesota and the Grey Oak in Thunder Bay.

The wreck site was listed on the National Register of Historic Places in 2012 for its state-level significance in the themes of commerce, historical archaeology, and maritime history.  It was nominated for its informational potential in illuminating late-19th-century wooden shipbuilding methods and maritime life.  The Mayflower holds particular value due to the rarity of her type and her atypical design.

See also
 National Register of Historic Places listings in St. Louis County, Minnesota

References

1887 ships
Great Lakes ships
Maritime incidents in 1891
Merchant ships of the United States
National Register of Historic Places in St. Louis County, Minnesota
Scows
Ships built in Sturgeon Bay, Wisconsin
Shipwrecks of Lake Superior
Shipwrecks on the National Register of Historic Places in Minnesota
Shipwrecks of the Minnesota coast
Wreck diving sites in the United States
Ships sunk in storms